Steven Bruce is a former association football player who represented New Zealand at international level.

Bruce played three official full internationals for New Zealand, making his debut in a 2–3 loss to New Caledonia on 29 July 1969. His other two matches were both losses against Israel, a 0–4 loss on 28 September and a 0–2 loss on 1 October 1969.

References

External links

Year of birth missing (living people)
Living people
New Zealand association footballers
New Zealand international footballers
Association footballers not categorized by position